Race to the Altar is an American reality television series hosted by Lisa Dergan. The series premiered July 30, 2003, on NBC. The show found 8 engaged couples to compete in a series of physical and mental challenges designed to test the strength of their relationship. Couples who won the challenges become power couples and have the authority to eliminate other couples. The audience voted on the winning couple in the second-to-last episode and then in the last episode the winning couple gets the prize, a fantasy wedding planned by Colin Cowie. A two-hour series finale aired September 13, 2003.

References

2000s American reality television series
2003 American television series debuts
2003 American television series endings
NBC original programming